Lorna Lewis is the name of:

 Lorna Lewis (writer) (died 1962), British writer
 Lorna Lewis (actress) (died 2013), American actress